Stephan Henrik Barratt-Due Jr. (born 1 June 1956 in Oslo, Norway) is a Norwegian violinist, the son of violinist Stephan Henrik Barrat-Due (1919–1985) and Else Barratt-Due (b. Holst, June 1925).

Biography 
Barrat-Due started his violin studies with his father at an early age. Later he attended the Norwegian Academy of Music and continued his studies in the Netherlands, Switzerland and the United States. He debuted in 1981, gave numerous concerts in Europe, the United States  and Asia, and has been the artistic director of the Barratt Due Institute of Music from 1985. He has been the artistic director of the Kristiansand Symphony Orchestra (1990–96), and an initiator and artistic leader of the Kristiansand Chamber Music Festival. Barrat-Due also has had extensive chamber musical collaboration with his former wife.

Honors 
2003: First class Knight of the Order of St. Olav
2012: The Norwegian Arts Council Honorary Award, together with Soon-Mi Chung

Discography (in selection) 

1986: Christian Sinding: Serenade For To Fioliner Og Klaver, Opus 92 / Serenade For To Fioliner Og Klaver, Opus 56 (Norsk Kulturråds Klassikerserie)
1988: Johan Halvorsen: Norwegian Rhapsody No 1 & 2 • Norwegian Festival Overture Op. 16 • Entry Of The Boyars • Bergensiana, (Roccoco  Variations) • Andante Religioso • Wedding March • Passacaglia (Norsk Kulturråds Klassikerserie), with Bergen Philharmonic Orchestra directed by Karsten Andersen
1994: Mozart, Nordheim, Hvoslef: DuoDu (Victoria Records), with Soon-Mi Chung		
2006: Grieg: Holberg Suite • Melodies For String Orchestra (Naxos Records), with Oslo Camerata

References

External links 

Norwegian violinists
Male violinists
Barratt Due Institute of Music alumni
Academic staff of the Barratt Due Institute of Music
Musicians from Oslo
1956 births
Living people
21st-century violinists
21st-century Norwegian male musicians